Volkach is a town in the district of Kitzingen in the Regierungsbezirk Unterfranken (Lower Franconia) in Bavaria, Germany. It lies on the river Main and has a population of around 8,700.

History 
Located outside the town but inside the municipal territory is the late-Gothic pilgrimage church  with a Madonna by Tilman Riemenschneider. It was stolen in 1962 but later recovered.

Arts and culture 
Volkach has hosted an annual wine festival since 1949.

Notable residents 

August von Rothmund (1831–1906), ophthalmologist and professor
Leo Kirch (1926–2011), media entrepreneur who led the Kirch Group
Marlies Dumbsky (born 1985), German Wine Queen
Friedrich Funk (1900–1963), politician (CSU), farmer, and member of the Bundestag 1949–1963 who lived in the town until his death

Mayors 
1945–1948: Josef Michael Erb
1948–1970: Georg Berz
1970–1990: Friedrich Ruß
1990–2002: Karl Andreas Schlier
2002–2020: Peter Kornell, reelected in 2008 and 2014
since 2020: Heiko Bäuerlein

Sights

External links 
 Volkach website

References 

Kitzingen (district)
Populated places on the Main basin
Populated riverside places in Germany